The Leuckart thiophenol reaction is the decomposition of a diazoxanthate, by gentle warming in a slightly acidic cuprous medium, to its corresponding aryl xanthates which give aryl thiols on alkaline hydrolysis and aryl thioethers on further warming.

This reaction was first reported by Rudolf Leuckart in 1890.

References

Organic reactions
Name reactions
Coupling reactions